Otilia Bădescu, born 31 October 1970 in Bucharest, Romania, is a former Romanian table tennis player.

Table tennis career
From 1986 to 2005 she won several medals in singles, doubles, and team events in the Table Tennis European Championships and three medals in the World Table Tennis Championships. 

Her three World Championship medals were all bronze medals won in the singles, team event and mixed doubles with Kalinikos Kreanga.

See also
 List of table tennis players
 List of World Table Tennis Championships medalists

References

Living people
Romanian female table tennis players
Olympic table tennis players of Romania
Table tennis players at the 1992 Summer Olympics
Table tennis players at the 1996 Summer Olympics
Table tennis players at the 2000 Summer Olympics
Table tennis players at the 2004 Summer Olympics
1970 births
Place of birth missing (living people)
Sportspeople from Bucharest